Team races at the Summer Olympics were track running competitions contested at the multi-sport event from 1900 to 1924.

The first such event was over 5000 metres at the 1900 Summer Olympics. This became a 4-mile race for the 1904 Summer Olympics, then a 3-mile race for the 1908 Summer Olympics. The most consistent format was over 3000 metres: this distance was contested on three consecutive occasions from 1912 to 1924, at which point track team races were removed from the Olympic athletics programme.

The races typically permitted up to five athletes per nation, with a minimum of three required to form a team. Each team score was the sum of the finishing positions of that nation's top three athletes. For example, first, second and third places would create a team score of six.

For 1900 and 1904 only two teams were entered: the point scoring format incorporated all five of each team's runners. On both occasions these were races between two major athletic clubs. In 1900 Racing Club de France competed against the Amateur Athletic Association (AAA) of Great Britain. In 1904 the New York Athletic Club took on the Chicago Athletic Association. Since the International Olympic Committee recognises only nations for medal table purposes, the AAA and Chicago teams are now designated as Mixed Olympic Teams as the presence of Australian Stan Rowley and French immigrant to the United States Albert Corey, respectively, meant that the teams fielded were not entirely British or American.

Medal summary

Multiple medalists

Note: William Seagrove was a 1920 silver medallist and was part of the British team in 1924, but as he was not in the top three British runners he did form part of their silver medal-winning team.

Medals by country

Non-canonical Olympic events
In addition to the main 1904 4-mile team race, a handicap competition was also staged. This race, contested over one mile, saw Missouri Athletic Club take on fellow American sports club St. Louis Southwest Turnverein. Missouri won the race in a time of 3:52.2, with the St. Louis team finishing some 80 yards off the winners.

This handicap race, along with numerous other handicap athletics events, is no longer considered part of the official Olympic history of the team race or the athletics programme in general. Consequently, medals from these competitions have not been assigned to nations on the all-time medal tables.

References
Athletics Men's 3,000 metres, Team Medalists. Sports Reference. Retrieved on 2014-03-22.
Athletics Men's 3 mile, Team Medalists. Sports Reference. Retrieved on 2014-03-12.
Athletics Men's 4 mile, Team Medalists. Sports Reference. Retrieved on 2014-03-12.
Athletics Men's 5,000 metres, Team Medalists. Sports Reference. Retrieved on 2014-03-12.
Specific

External links
Official Olympics website

 
Olympics
Team races